The sixth and final season of the animated television series Johnny Test originally aired on Cartoon Network in the United States. The season was announced by Teletoon on June 12, 2012, consisting of 26 episodes, with two segments each. In the United States, the season premiered on Boomerang on April 2, 2013, and on Cartoon Network on April 23. In Canada, it began airing on September 4, 2013, on Teletoon. This season would feature the return of Ashleigh Ball, who departed after Season 4, as the voices of Mary Test and Sissy Blakely. According to the end credits, Warner Bros. still owns its trademark.

Reception

Ratings
According to Nielsen Media Research, numerous episodes of the season ranked first among the network's targeted demographic of boys aged 2–11, 6–11 and 9–14: "Smooth Talking Johnny" on June 11, 2013; "Road Trip Johnny" on January 21, 2014; and "Johnny's Junky Trunk" on March 4, 2014. The 2013 premieres of "Johnny's Head in the Clouds" on July 16, "Johnny's #1 Fan" on May 14 and "Johnny Unplugged" on November 13 all ranked first for boys aged 6–11 and 9–14, while the premiere of "Crash Test Johnny" on February 25, 2014, only ranked first among boys aged 9–14.

Home media
The season was made available for digital download through the iTunes Store, with the first of a two-part volume consisting of 13 episodes released on September 4, 2013, but it was removed in 2021–2022. The season is available to stream on Netflix.

Accolades
Writer Ethan Banville was nominated for a WGC Screenwriting Award by the Writers Guild of Canada in 2014 for his episode "Stop in the Name of Johnny". The ceremony was hosted at the Telus Centre for Performance and Learning's Koerner Hall.

Cast
 James Arnold Taylor as Johnny Test
 Trevor Devall as Dukey
 Ashleigh Ball as Mary Test
 Maryke Hendrikse as Susan Test

Episodes

References

2013 American television seasons
2014 American television seasons
Johnny Test seasons
2013 Canadian television seasons
2014 Canadian television seasons